This is a list of matches of FC Dnipro in European competitions.

European Cup/UEFA Champions League

UEFA Cup/UEFA Europa League

Overall

Finals

Won Semi-finals

Won Quarter-finals

Lost Quarter-finals

European performances

Overall record

 1 Group stage. Highest-ranked eliminated team in case of qualification, lowest-ranked qualified team in case of elimination.

References

Europe
Ukrainian football clubs in international competitions
Soviet football clubs in international competitions